Veliki Videm is a small settlement north of Šentlovrenc in the Municipality of Trebnje in eastern Slovenia. The area is part of the traditional region of Lower Carniola. The Municipality of Trebnje is now included in the Southeast Slovenia Statistical Region.

References

External links
Veliki Videm at Geopedia

Populated places in the Municipality of Trebnje